Zhou Chengzhou (周承舟; born 28 December 1982) is a Chinese photographer and film director.

Early life 
Zhou Chengzhou was born in Changde city (常德) in Hunan Province in Dec. 1982. 

When zhou was 7 years old, his father taught him how to use a film camera and produce sharper photos, sparking the start of his love of photography. He was only doing it for fun at the time and had no plans to make a career out of photography. 

He spent several years developing shoes after earning his degree in Chinese Language and Literature from Peking University in 2005. However, it was during this period that his love for photography was rekindled as he took over 200,000 images of the shoes to promote them online. This enhanced his photographic abilities. 

In 2015, he shifted more of his attention to photography, honing his skills through various experiences, including a stint on the set of a TV show and shooting at Paris Fashion Week in 2016. He then officially became a photographer and embarked on a career behind the lens, shooting photos of giant engineering projects and high-speed rail infrastructure using drones. As his experience grew, he sought to break away from traditional photography concepts and develop his style.

Biography 
He focuses mostly on producing and studying work related to spiritual consciousness. His work underscores the gap between people and a broader universal culture while including themes of industrialization, urbanization, and marginalization.

Awards and honors 

 The Lensculture Summer open Awards 2022, Winner
 Silvana S. Foundation Commission Award 2022, Shortlist

 The 1x photo awards 2017/18, Winner

 Aesthetica Art Prize 2019 and 2023, Finalist
 Photofest with National Geographic award 2019, Winner

 Lensculture Art photography award 2018, Finalist

 5th FAPA Award, Finalist

Filmmaking career 
His first film, Sub-subconscious, was released in 2020, won the Best Audience Award feature film at 13 festival del cinema patologico ,and won the Jury Award at LA Underground Film Forum. It was Nominated by Adirondack Film Festival, and Jelly Film Festival.

He completed his second film, Unreflex Land, in 2021.

He completed his first feature film, Time provider, in 2022.

Filmography

Exhibitions 
Times paradise - 798 Art Zone, IDEAL GAS, 2023

Where did the trash go? - Exhibition at Today Art Museum, 2020

Beyond Boundaries - LensCulture Exhibition at Aperture Gallery 2019

Under the Consciousness - Aesthetica Art Prize 2019 Exhibition at York Art Gallery, 2019

A Planet In Balance - Photofest with National Geographic sponsored gallery 2019

Multidimensional nature - Pingyao International Photography Festival, 2017

Publications 

 X, 1X, 2018 
 Future Now, 2019 
 Vulgar life and elegant chant, Chinese -style Mondrian, P232-233, 2015,

References

External links 

Living people
Chinese photographers
Chinese film directors
Chinese contemporary art
People from Changde
1982 births